Selwood may refer to:

Places
Selwood, Ontario a former community in Greater Sudbury in Ontario in Canada
Selwood Forest in southwest England
Selwood, Somerset in southwest England

People with the surname
Adam Selwood (born 1984), Australian rules footballer
Brad Selwood, professional hockey defenceman
Troy Selwood (born 1984), Australian rules footballer
Joel Selwood (born 1988), Australian rules footballer
Scott Selwood (born 1990), Australian rules footballer
Steven Selwood, English cricketer

See also
Sellwood (disambiguation)